Kroczewo  is a village in the administrative district of Gmina Załuski, within Płońsk County, Masovian Voivodeship, in east-central Poland. The village has a population of 202.

References

Kroczewo